ISO 7010 is an International Organization for Standardization technical standard for graphical hazard symbols on hazard and safety signs, including those indicating emergency exits. It uses colours and principles set out in ISO 3864 for these symbols, and is intended to provide "safety information that relies as little as possible on the use of words to achieve understanding." 

The standard was published in October 2003, splitting off from ISO 3864:1984, which set out design standards and colors of safety signage and merging ISO 6309:1987, Fire protection - Safety signs to create a unique and distinct standard for safety symbols.

, the latest version is ISO 7010:2019, with 6 published amendments. This revision canceled and replaced ISO 20712-1:2008, incorporating the water safety signs and beach safety flags specified in it.

Shape and colour 
ISO 7010 specifies five combinations of shape and colour to distinguish between the type of information presented.

List 
ISO registers and lists recommended pictograms, which it calls "safety signs", on its website, ISO.org.  The ISO standard provides a registered number for pictograms that have officially been made part of the ISO 7010 standard.  Corresponding with the categories above, in ISO parlance, "E" numbers refer to Emergency (signs showing a safe condition), "F" numbers refer to Fire protection, "P" numbers refer to Prohibited actions, "M" numbers refer to Mandatory actions, and "W" numbers refer to Warnings of hazards.

According to the related ISO 3864-1 standard, if a symbol does not exist for a situation, the recommended solution is to use the relevant 'general' symbol (M001, P001, W001), along with a supplemental text message.

Safe condition

Crescent variant
ISO 7010 states on all symbols with an first aid cross, that it "may be replaced with another element appropriate to cultural requirements". In countries with a Muslim-majority population, an appropiate symbol is the crescent.

Fire protection

Mandatory

Prohibition

Warning

Withdrawn symbols
The following symbols were previously part of ISO 7010, but have since been withdrawn from the standard.

See also 
 Hazard symbol
 ISO 3864 – Safety colors and safety signs
 ISO 7001 – Public Information Symbols
 ANSI Z535 – The United States national standard for safety information
 GHS hazard pictograms – Symbols used by the Globally Harmonized System of Classification and Labelling of Chemicals

References

External links 

ISO 7010:2019 Graphical symbols -- Safety colours and safety signs -- Registered safety signs

07010
Symbols
Pictograms